Joseph Arthur Rothschild (April 5, 1931, at Fulda, Germany – January 30, 2000, at New York City) was an American professor of history and political science at Columbia University, specializing in Central European and Eastern European history.

Rothschild was a member of the Academy of Political Science, the American Association for the Advancement of Slavic Studies, the Polish Institute of Arts and Sciences of America, Phi Beta Kappa and American Professors for Peace in the Middle East (of which he was the national vice chairman in the years 1975–1990). From 1985 he was also a member of the Commission on International Affairs for the American Jewish Congress.

He served on the editorial boards of the Middle East Review and the Political Science Quarterly. He received a Guggenheim Fellowship In 1967.

Rothschild graduated from Columbia University with a bachelor's and a master's degree. He received his doctorate from the University of Oxford.

Books 
  
  [adapted from material presented during the Columbia Lectures in International Studies television series]
 Pilsudski's Coup D'État (1966)

Notes

References

 Ira Katznelson, Joseph Rothschild, PS: Political Science and Politics, Vol. 34, No. 2 (Jun. 2001), pp. 344–345, Published by: American Political Science Association, JSTOR
 Joseph Rothschild, Expert on East Central Europe, Dead at 70, The Record, Columbia University's official newspaper, Vol.25, No. 14, February 11, 2000

External links

1931 births
2000 deaths
American political scientists
20th-century American historians
American male non-fiction writers
Columbia University faculty
German emigrants to the United States
American people of German-Jewish descent
20th-century American male writers
Columbia College (New York) alumni
Alumni of the University of Oxford
Columbia Graduate School of Arts and Sciences alumni
20th-century political scientists